A rhino ferry is a barge constructed from several pontoons which are connected and equipped with outboard engines, used to transport heavy equipment and people. Rhino ferries were used extensively during the Normandy landings and other theaters (Attu, Africa, Sicily, Italy); their low draft was well-suited for shallow beaches, and they could also be used as piers when filled with water. An alternative to tank landing craft, they were operated by United States Navy Construction Battalions. They ferried their cargo from the outlying Landing Ships, Tank to the shore.

For the Normandy invasion, components were shipped from the US. Initial construction in the UK was by the USN Construction battalions. Rhinos (and causeways, which used the same components) were also assembled by British Army Royal Engineers.

See also
 Mexeflote, similar device, 1960s to present day
 Floating battery
 Barracks ship
 Type B ship
 Navy lighterage pontoons

References

External links
 US Navy footage of Rhino barges in action, Normandy, June 11, 1944.

Buoyancy devices
Coastal construction
Operation Overlord